The 1928 Tour of the Basque Country was the fifth edition of the Tour of the Basque Country cycle race and was held from 1 August to 5 August 1928. The race started in Bilbao and finished in Las Arenas. The race was won by Maurice De Waele.

General classification

References

1928
Bas